Submarine is a 1928 silent drama film directed by Frank Capra. It was produced by Harry Cohn for Columbia Pictures, and released with a synchronized music score and sound effects. This was Capra's first attempt to make an "A-picture".

Plot
Two sailor buddies have their friendship torn apart after the woman they both are in love with chooses one over the other.  Their relationship gets re-evaluated when one of them becomes trapped in a submarine and the other gets sent on the rescue mission.

Cast
 Jack Holt as Jack Dorgan  
 Dorothy Revier as Bessie, Mrs. Jack Dorgan  
 Ralph Graves as Bob Mason  
 Clarence Burton as Submarine Commander  
 Arthur Rankin as The Boy

References

External links
Submarine allrovi/synopsis

1928 films
American black-and-white films
Columbia Pictures films
1928 drama films
Films directed by Frank Capra
American silent feature films
Submarine films
Silent American drama films
1920s American films
Silent adventure films